Neptis clarei, or Clare's sailer, is a butterfly in the family Nymphalidae. It is found in Uganda, western Kenya and possibly north-western Tanzania. The habitat consists of forests.

The larvae feed on Paullinia pinnata.

References

Butterflies described in 1904
clarei